Beverly Leon is a former American footballer and entrepreneur. She played as a midfielder for Sunderland in the FA Women's Super League. She previously played for the Icelandic Stjarnan club.

Biography 
Leon grew up in Wrentham, Massachusetts, and attended Milton Academy, where she was Boston Globe Player of the Year, and the recipient of Milton's Priscilla Bailey Award for demonstrating "exceptional individual skills and teamwork as well as sportsmanship."

Leon then attended Columbia University and played for Columbia's varsity women's soccer team. After graduating from Columbia in 2014, Leon worked for Morgan Stanley in the global capital markets division.

After a year at Morgan Stanley, Leon played for Stjarnan women's football and then signed to play for Sunderland A.F.C. Ladies as a midfielder. She was the top scorer in the team's 2017 Spring Series.

Leon then pursued her education at Green Templeton College, Oxford and Columbia Business School. In 2018, she founded Local Civics, which is a startup that uses game-based learning to encourage kids to strengthen their civic leadership skills. Leon was named to the 2022 Forbes 30 Under 30 list.

References 

Living people
Soccer players from Massachusetts
Columbia Lions women's soccer players
Stjarnan women's football players
Sunderland A.F.C. Ladies players
Columbia Business School alumni
Morgan Stanley employees
American women company founders
Alumni of Templeton College, Oxford
People from Wrentham, Massachusetts
1992 births
American women's soccer players
Women's association football midfielders